The flag of Saint Pierre and Miquelon is officially the flag of France, as Saint Pierre and Miquelon is a self-governing overseas collectivity of France.

History
In 1982 an unofficial local flag was designed, based on the Collectivity's coat of arms. The flag is blue with a yellow ship, said to be Grande Hermine, which brought Jacques Cartier to Saint Pierre on 15 June 1536.  Three square fields placed along the hoist recall the origin of most inhabitants of the islands, from top to bottom, Basques, Bretons, and Normans. The flag was likely designed by André Paturel, a local business owner.
Although not used at an official level, the flag is still a common sight in the territory, being flown alongside the French tricolour in front of government buildings or even private residences.

Municipalities

See also
Coat of arms of Saint Pierre and Miquelon
Flag of France
National emblem of France

References

External links

 
 St Pierre & Miquelon
 St Pierre & Miquelon Community Website

Flags of Overseas France
Flag
Unofficial flags
Saint
Saint-Pierre
Flags introduced in 1982